Lavenski R. "Vence" Smith (born October 31, 1958) is an American judge, who is the Chief Judge of the United States Court of Appeals for the Eighth Circuit. He previously served as an Arkansas state judge, and has been a federal judge since 2002.

Education
Smith, a lifelong Arkansan, is a native of Hope, Arkansas, and graduated from Hope High School. He completed a Bachelor of Arts degree at the University of Arkansas in 1981, and a Juris Doctor degree at the University of Arkansas School of Law in 1987.

Career
Before joining the federal bench, Smith worked in both private practice and public service. He was an unsuccessful Republican candidate for the Arkansas Court of Appeals in 1998. Notably, Governor Mike Huckabee had appointed Smith as an Associate Justice of the Arkansas Supreme Court in 1999 as well as a Commissioner on the Arkansas Public Service Commission in 2001. Smith had also been an assistant professor at John Brown University and an Executive Director of the Rutherford Institute.

Federal judicial service
He was nominated to the United States Court of Appeals for the Eighth Circuit by President George W. Bush on September 4, 2001 and was confirmed by the United States Senate on July 15, 2002 by voice vote. He has been Chief Judge since March 11, 2017. In October 2022, Smith was appointed by U.S. Supreme Court Chief Justice John Roberts to serve as the newest chair of the Judicial Conference's executive committee. His appointment took effect on October 1, 2022.

See also 
 List of African-American federal judges
 List of African-American jurists

References

External links

1958 births
21st-century American judges
African-American judges
Justices of the Arkansas Supreme Court
Judges of the United States Court of Appeals for the Eighth Circuit
Living people
People from Hope, Arkansas
United States court of appeals judges appointed by George W. Bush
University of Arkansas alumni